The Congregation of Divine Providence (or Sisters of Divine Providence) is the name of two Roman Catholic religious institutes of women which have developed from the work of Jean-Martin Moye (1730-1793), a French Catholic priest. They are dedicated to the instruction and care of the neediest of the world.

Moye saw the lack of educational opportunities for females in the rural sectors of his large parish in the then Duchy of Lorraine, soon to be a part of France. It took its final form in 1852. The general motherhouse of the larger congregation is in Saint-Jean-de-Bassel, Moselle, France. The Sisters of this congregation serve on four continents. They both use the postnominal initials of C.D.P..

History

Origins
Jean-Martin Moye was a parish priest in the area of Lorraine, France. Concerned about the lack of educational opportunities for young women and girls, and the general ignorance in the region about the faith, Moye instructed several young women. On 14 January 1762, Moye sent out four literate women, under the leadership of Marguerite LeComte, whom he had recruited to teach in the remote hamlets of the region what was needed for the improvement of the peoples' lives, as well as the Catholic faith. These women were to live alone and without provisions, like the first Christians, sharing in the daily labor of the local populace and trusting in God's divine providence to provide for them.

Though pious, the women lacked any formal knowledge of teaching. Moye trained them in child psychology, in order to prepare them to teach effectively and in a Christian manner, instructing all those whom they met. They were instructed to provide special help to the less gifted and to the poor who had become distasteful to others from the situations of their lives. This innovative ministry by single women quickly came under criticism by some for this irregular behavior. In their first year of operation, the association was suppressed by the religious authorities. They did not, however, close the schools opened by the women, which immediately began to expand.

Moye gave them the title "Poor Sisters of the Child Jesus", but the villagers called them "Poor Sisters of Providence".

Moye later traveled to China to do missionary work, then returned to France to administer the new congregation. Driven into exile during the French Revolution, in 1793 he succumbed to typhus contracted while nursing fellow refugees, and was beatified by Pope Pius XII in 1954.  His feast day is celebrated on May 4.

Restoration and division
The French Revolution caused the closing of the schools of the congregation and scattered the Sisters. The loss of their founder and guide left the sisters uncertain as to their future. When two priests returned from exile to Lorraine, they guided the surviving sisters in re-forming the community. The German-speaking sisters established a base in the town of Saint Jean de Bassel in 1827, opening schools throughout Moselle and Alsace. The French-speaking Sisters were headquartered in Portieux, serving the Department of Vosges. The two groups separated into separate congregations in 1852.

The Sisters of Providence of Portieux continue to serve in that region as a congregation of diocesan right. In 1905, during the French Protectorate of Cambodia, these sisters opened a mission in Battambang, where they operated a hospital and orphanage.

Expansion
With the permission of their Superiors, the Sisters of Providence opened a novitiate in Santiago, Chile on January 3, 1857. Victoire Larroque, cofounder of the Community of Montreal, served as the superior. When Larroque died the following month, Bernard Morin became Superior of the motherhouse of Santiago.

In 1866, the congregation expanded with a mission to the United States. In 1868 they sent a small group of Sisters to Algeria, who returned to France in 1871. During that period, they began to expand into new forms of service, opening a trade school  for boys in Lixheim that same year, as well as ones to train girls in housekeeping. In 1879 Sisters began to serve in Belgium, and in 1889 a new mission was sent to the United States in Kentucky.

During World War II, Alsace was again made part of Germany, and the sisters faced the anti-Catholic regulations of the Nazi regime, under which their schools were closed. Many sisters fled to the part of the region under the government of Vichy France until the end of the war. A few, however, stayed and operated clandestine private schools at great personal risk.

After the war, a mission to Madagascar was established in 1950, in response to a request to staff a sanatorium there. The sisters began to serve in the French Department of Mayotte in the Pacific region, their first presence in a Muslim country. They served there until 1988. They expanded to Ecuador in 1982.

Presence
At present, the Sisters of Divine Providence serve in Belgium, Comoros, Ecuador, France,  Madagascar, Mali, Poland and the United States. They have served briefly in Algeria, Germany, Ghana and Romania.

The congregation was divided in 1999 into three provinces: 
 The European Province, with its motherhouse in Saint Jean de Bassel, numbers about 400 sisters, serving in Belgium, France and Poland.
 The Madagascar Province currently numbers about 100 members, most of whom are native Malagasys.
 The American Province, established in 1889, is based in Melbourne, Kentucky, and has 115 sisters serving in the United States and Ecuador. It currently has 115 members.

Legacy
The first overseas mission of the congregation was established in 1866 in the United States. The sisters were recruited by Claude Dubuis, the Bishop of Galveston, Texas, to teach in the rural towns of his diocese. It developed into an autonomous congregation in 1886, with its motherhouse in San Antonio, Texas. This congregation has a province in Mexico. They operate Our Lady of the Lake University and Providence High School in San Antonio.

Another congregation which has a connection to this one is that of the Sisters of Providence of Ruillé-sur-Loir, France, founded in 1806, whose founder adopted the Rule of Life and religious habit of this congregation. An offshoot of the Ruillé-sur-Loir congregation is the American congregation of the Sisters of Providence of St. Mary of the Woods, based in Indiana.

Notable members
 Sister Mary Elaine Gentemann, an American  composer.

References

 
Catholic female orders and societies
1760s establishments in Lorraine
1762 establishments in France
Catholic religious institutes established in the 18th century
Catholic teaching orders